Jafarqoli Khan, also known as Jafarqoli Beg, was a Safavid official of Georgian origin who served as the governor (beglarbeg) of Astarabad in 1664 or 1666, during the reign of king Abbas II (1642-1666). A scion of the Undiladze clan, Jafarqoli Khan was a grandson of the celebrated Safavid military and political leader Imam-Quli Khan, a son by one of his daughters and her husband Dāvūd (sometime governor of Dashtestan). Though the Undiladze family had almost been annihilated in its entirety in the early years of king Safi's reign (1629-1642), the succession of the family amongst the Safavid court elites was assured by Jafarqoli.

Sources
  
 

17th-century deaths
Iranian people of Georgian descent
Safavid governors of Astarabad
Undiladze
Shia Muslims from Georgia (country)
17th-century people of Safavid Iran